Fort Oglethorpe is a city predominantly in Catoosa County with some portions in Walker County in the U.S. state of Georgia. As of the 2020 census, the city had a population of 10,423. It is part of the Chattanooga, TN–GA Metropolitan Statistical Area. It is home to Lakeview – Fort Oglethorpe High School.

History
The United States Army established a cavalry post at the site of Hargrave, Georgia, an unincorporated town situated next to the Chickamauga National Battlefield. The existing settlement was named for a Confederate soldier, William Hamilton Hargrave, who along with his wife Amelia Cecilia Strange-Hargrave owned most of the land in the area. The couple was well known in the 19th century to travellers heading to Ross's Landing on the Tennessee River from LaFayette, Georgia. William Hargrave and other landowners in the area were forced to sell their property to the Army to be used as a base for the 6th Cavalry. The Chickamauga Post established in 1902 by the U.S. Army was later named Fort Oglethorpe after James Oglethorpe, the founder of the Colony of Georgia. During and after World War I, the fort served between 1917 and 1920 as an detention camp for civilian internees and prisoners of war. During World War II, the area served as a war-time induction and processing center, and again housed prisoners of war. Fort Oglethorpe was a major training center for the Women's Army Corps during World War II. The post land was declared surplus in 1947 and returned to civilian hands, forming the nucleus for a town that was incorporated in 1949.

Geography
Fort Oglethorpe is located in western Catoosa County and northeastern Walker County at  (34.945683, -85.245653). The Chickamauga and Chattanooga National Military Park takes up the southern two-thirds of the city's area.

Demographics

2020 census

As of the 2020 United States census, there were 10,423 people, 3,994 households, and 2,240 families residing in the city.

2000 census
As of the 2000 U.S. census, there were 6,940 people, 2,873 households, and 1,881 families residing in the city. The racial makeup of the city was 93.14% White, 2.38% African American, 0.19% Native American, 2.07% Asian, 0.03% Pacific Islander, 0.56% from other races, and 1.63% from two or more races. Hispanic or Latino of any race were 1.41% of the population.

There were 2,873 households, out of which 29.3% had children under the age of 18 living with them, 47.0% were married couples living together, 15.0% had a female householder with no husband present, and 34.5% were non-families. 30.6% of all households were made up of individuals, and 13.3% had someone living alone who was 65 years of age or older.  The average household size was 2.29 and the average family size was 2.86.

In the city, the population was spread out, with 22.8% under the age of 18, 9.5% from 18 to 24, 26.3% from 25 to 44, 21.8% from 45 to 64, and 19.6% 65 years of age or older.  The median age was 38 years. For every 100 females, there were 82.2 males.  For every 100 females age 18 and over, there were 76.9 males.

The median income for a household in the city was $32,095, and the median income for a family was $40,643. Males had a median income of $28,160 versus $21,141 for females. The per capita income for the city was $16,288.  About 11.5% of families and 17.4% of the population were below the poverty line, including 30.8% of those under age 18 and 11.3% of those age 65 or over.

References

External links
 City of Fort Oglethorpe official website
 6th Cavalry Regiment Museum
 Chickamauga & Chattanooga National Military Park

Cities in Georgia (U.S. state)
Cities in Catoosa County, Georgia
Cities in Walker County, Georgia
Cities in the Chattanooga metropolitan area
Populated places established in 1949
1949 establishments in Georgia (U.S. state)